Henry G. Sell (1884–1968) was an American film actor of the silent era. He appeared in a number of serials produced by Pathé Exchange including several with Pearl White.

Selected filmography
 The Iron Claw (1916, serial)
 The Fatal Ring (1917, serial)
 The Seven Pearls (1917, serial)
 The Lightning Raider (1919, serial)
 The Black Secret (1919, serial)
 The Twin Pawns (1919)
 Thin Ice (1919)
 The Empire of Diamonds (1920)
 A Woman in Grey (1920)
 Devotion (1921)
 East Lynne (1921)
 The Money Maniac (1921)
 Free Air (1922)

References

Bibliography
 Klepper, Robert K. Silent Films, 1877-1996: A Critical Guide to 646 Movies. McFarland, 2015.

External links

1884 births
1968 deaths
American male film actors
People from Los Angeles